This is a list of family relations in Allsvenskan. Since the creation of the Allsvenskan in 1924, family members have been involved in all aspects of the league. Although most connections are among players, there have been family members involved in coaching  as well.

The Nordahl has had the largest number of family members – seven – play and coach in Allsvenskan. The original five brothers (Bertil, Knut, Gunnar, Gösta, Göran) and two of their sons (cousins Thomas and Per-Gösta) result in multiple brother/father-son/uncle-nephew/cousin combinations.

The longest multi-generational family is the direct line of three generations starting with Gösta Sandberg, father of Lars Sandberg, who is father-in-law of Anton Sandberg Magnusson and Gustav Sandberg Magnusson, and the Bild family: Harry Bild, uncle of Per-Olof Bild, who is the father Andreas and Fredrik Bild. To note is also the Hysén family of Allsvenskan players: brothers Erik and Carl Hysén, Eriks's grandson Glenn Hysén, whose sons Tobias and Anton Hysén also have played in Allsvenskan, all except Anton for IFK Göteborg. Glenn's father Kurt Hysén also played for IFK Göteborg, however not in the senior team.

Another family is the Svensson family playing for Östers IF: brothers Peter and Tommy Svensson, and their brothers-in-law Karl-Axel Blomqvist and Kalle Björklund, Blomqvist's grandson Matteo Blomqvist-Zampi and Björklund's son Joachim Björklund. Peter and Tommy Svensson's father (and the father-in-law of Karl-Axel Blomqvist and Karl-Gunnar Björklund) played for Östers IF before they were promoted to Allsvenskan and was chairman during a number of Allsvenskan seasons.

Below is a list of family relations throughout Allsvenskan as players and managers.

Brothers

Father and son

Grandfather and grandson

Great-grandfather and great-grandson

Uncle and nephew
This category is for such pairings not already listed in the Brothers and Father and son sections above.

Cousins

In-laws

References

Sweden
Family
Allsvenskan lists
Association football player non-biographical articles